The Kennedy Mansion is a dwelling located at 502 S. Okmulgee Ave. in Okmulgee, Oklahoma.  The mansion was listed on the National Register of Historic Places listings in Okmulgee County, Oklahoma on December 10, 2014.

History
The mansion is located southwest of the commercial core of Okmulgee, which is itself NRHP-listed as the Okmulgee Downtown Historic District.  It was constructed for Asa D. Kennedy and Nellie Kennedy; Asa D. Kennedy was a bank founder and real estate investor.  The house was completed in 1904 by builder Henry Clay Kennady (sic).  The house is a sub-type of the Colonial Revival style, having a hipped roof with a full-width porch; about one-third of Colonial Revival houses built prior to 1915 were of this sub-type.

A two-story clapboard Carriage House, also built around 1904 and located southwest of the main house, is a contributing structure on the property.  Also contributing is a one-story shed, built around 1915, which has a set of hinged doors on the side gable elevation and a double hung window in each gable end.

The house continues to stand as a private dwelling, and a non-contributing structure, being a garage built circa 2000, is also on the property.

References

Buildings and structures completed in 1904
1904 establishments in Oklahoma Territory
Colonial Revival architecture in the United States